The Imp (兇榜; Taiwan name:魔界轉世/魔界轉生) is a 1981 Hong Kong horror film directed by Dennis Yu.

Plot
With a pregnant wife at home, Keung has been struggling to find a job when he finally finds work as a security guard in a commercial building. Strange incidents occur in the building and his colleagues begin to one-by-one die in horrible ways due to an imp. A geomancer warns Keung that he will be the next victim and teaches him how to avoid the fate. But Keung discovers the imp is trying to possess his baby. Failing to stop this, the ending shows him trying to kill the baby with an axe.

Cast
 Chan Shen - Old uncle Han
 Kent Cheng - Fatty
 Charlie Chin -Cheung Ging-Keung		
 Wong Ching - Mr. Hong Kong
 Yueh Hua (credited as Wah Ngor)
 Yu Yi-ha

Reception

Devon B. from Digital Retribution awarded the film a score of 1/5, writing, "The Imp is a somewhat slow movie that lacks any real eeriness until the climax." Peter Nepstad from The Illuminated Lantern awarded the film 4/4 stars, praising the film's characterizations, and slow build of supernatural tension.

References

External links
 
 

1981 films
1981 horror films
1980s Cantonese-language films
1980s supernatural horror films
Hong Kong supernatural horror films
Demons in film
1980s Hong Kong films